Gabriel Laderman (December 26, 1929 – March 10, 2011) was a New York painter and an early and important exponent of the Figurative revival of the 1950s and 1960s.

He studied with a number of leading American painters, including Hans Hofmann, Willem de Kooning, and Mark Rothko.

Biography

Education
In 1948 he began by doing the exercises in Paul Klee's Pedagogical Sketchbook, which at the time was available only in the original Bauhaus edition in German.

In the summer of 1949 he went to Provincetown and studied with Hans Hofmann. Since he already knew about abstract expressionist painting (Willem de Kooning had had his first show) he began painting in that tradition, informed with what Hofmann had taught about forming.

He met de Kooning that summer and began to show him his work in September of that year on a regular basis, while also attending Brooklyn College where he studied with Ad Reinhardt, Alfred Russell, Mark Rothko, Burgoyne Diller, Jimmy Ernst, Stanley William Hayter and Robert J. Wolff (the chairman of the department).

He also began to go to Hayter's Atelier 17, which he used as a shop for printing his engraved and etched plates.

About his Brooklyn College years, Laderman said:

"The school was a hot bed of abstract painting radicalism. One of the major buzzwords was for us to try to get "on the idea level." That meant having a pictorial idea which would generate work. It was clear that my teachers at Brooklyn and also both de Kooning and Hayter did not believe that they had to go through the motions of imitating recent radical art. They were going out on their own and inventing new art. All of them, though, believed that there were pictorial actions which guided art making and were required to validate the work. But those actions could be unheard of ones, or ideas imported from elsewhere and other forms. Russell had us not only drawing in the Natural History museum, but also highly touted the value of drawing parked cars, looking through the windows into the internal spaces, and those as seen in a second car through a first one. Reinhardt made a trip around the world and came back with slides of Islamic architecture, often severely symmetrical, but with Arabic calligraphy incised, which had no symmetry, since it was excerpted from the Koran. He also brought back slides of the interiors of Hindu and Buddhist temples that were so dark it was almost impossible to make out the figures. We understood his paintings, both because we could see their actions, and because he made his ideational sources clear through the images he showed in school and at his lectures. I also was one of the youngest members of the artist's club, which started while I was in college on the top floor of the building above Atelier 17. This was the abstract expressionist hangout, and it was where the members of the movement displayed their ideas and publicly disagreed with one another."

After graduating from Brooklyn, he spent a year as a graduate student in art history in the New York University Institute of Fine Arts. There, he studied Asian art and 14th century Italian art. Both traditions influenced his later work.

In 1955, after two years in the army, he went to Cornell University for his MFA, with an assistantship in painting. During his time there, he began to try to paint from nature with less distortion and invention.

Teaching
In 1957 he was appointed Instructor in art at SUNY, New Paltz. After two years at New Paltz he was offered a raise in rank, but chose to return to New York where he taught at Pratt Institute until 1967 when he began teaching at Queens College, CUNY.

From 1967 through 1996 he was artist in residence and lectured at many schools and museums, including Princeton University, Yale University, Bennington College, Philadelphia College of Art, Pennsylvania Academy, University of Pennsylvania, the Tyler School of Art, Moore College of Art, Boston University, The Boston Museum School, at the Museum of Fine Arts, Boston, Amherst College, Stanford University, Kansas City Art Institute, Art School of Surabaya, Art Center Jakarta, USIS centers in Japan in Tokyo, Nagoya, Sapporo and Fukuoka, Royal College of Art, Bangkok, Victorian College of Art, Melbourne; College Ballarat, Indiana University, Bloomington, Louisiana State University, Arizona State, American University, Skowhegan, Chautauqua, the Art Students League of New York, and the Yale-Norfolk School.

He retired from teaching in 1996 but continued to paint.

Paintings and exhibitions
His first exhibited painting, in 1949, was abstract expressionist, in the vein of de Kooning's work.

Starting with a show of engravings and intaglios at the Tanager Gallery in 1960 his work was painted from nature and always representational.

Starting in 1962, he exhibited with the Schoelkopf Gallery until the gallery was closed, due to the death of its proprietor.

Subsequently, he showed with Peter Tatistcheff.

His work, starting in the 1980s was usually of the figure including a number of major paintings with subject matter. The early subject matter paintings were all about crimes, and several were based on the Maigret series of detective novels by the Belgian author Georges Simenon, including the series "Murder and its Consequences", and his most famous painting "The House of Death and Life".

Death 
Laderman died of heart failure at age 81, on March 10, 2011, in Manhattan.

Selected museum exhibitions
 Whitney Museum of American Art
 Museum of Fine Arts, Boston
 Art Institute of Chicago
 Pennsylvania Academy of Fine Arts

Awards and honors
 National Academy of Design — Altman Prize
 1993 National Academy of Design — Thomas R. Proctor Prize
 1992 Elected into the National Academy of Design
 1990 Ingram-Merrill Award
 1989 Rockefeller Foundation, Resident Artist at Bellagio
 1988 Queens College Presidential Fellowship,
 1988 Guggenheim Fellowship
 1988 CUNY Research Foundation
 1987 National Endowment for the Arts Senior Fellowship
 1986 CUNY Research Award
 1983 Ingram-Merrill Award
 1982 National Endowment for the Arts Senior Fellowship, CUNY Research Award
 1975 Dept. of the Interior — Bicentennial Landscape Commission, Ingram-Merrill Award
 1973 CUNY Research Award
 1962 Fulbright Award to Italy
 1960 Yaddo Fellowship
 1959 Yaddo Fellowship, Louis Comfort Tiffany Award

Selected collections
 Andrew Dickson White Museum, Cornell University
 Archdiocese of Baton Rouge, Louisiana
 Brandeis University, Rose Art Museum
 Chicago Art Institute
 Chase Manhattan Bank
 Cleveland Museum of Art
 Davidson Collection
 Edmund P. Pillsbury
 Fidelity Bank, Philadelphia
 FMC Corporation, Chicago
 Malcolm Holtzman
 Glenn C. Janss Collection, Boise Art Museum
 Innes Collection, Charlottesville
 The Jalane and Richard Davidson Collection, Art Institute of Chicago
 Jane Livingston
 Mead Art Museum, Amherst, MA
 Montclair State College
 Museum of Fine Arts, Boston
 National Academy of Design, NYC
 National Gallery of Art, Washington, DC
 National Museum (Muzium Negara), Kuala Lumpur, Malaysia.
 National Museum of American Art, Smithsonian Institution, Washington, DC
 Robert Natkin
 Sierra Club
 Spurzem Collection
 Uris-Hilton Hotels
 Weatherspoon Gallery, NC
 William Bailey

Notes

References

External links
 Gabriel Laderman: Unconventional Realist
 Gabriel Laderman, Poetic Realist
 Gabriel Laderman at Tatistcheff (a review)
 Gimlet Eye Art: Laderman
 Essay by Gabriel Laderman:"Learning to Draw Without a Master"
 Gabriel Laderman's Art Blog
  The New Republic Obituary: Honoring Gabriel Laderman, who wielded a battering ram on behalf of beauty

20th-century American painters
American male painters
21st-century American painters
21st-century American male artists
Cornell University College of Architecture, Art, and Planning alumni
Painters from New York City
Art Students League of New York faculty
1929 births
2011 deaths
Moore College of Art and Design faculty
University of the Arts (Philadelphia) faculty
Brooklyn College alumni
20th-century American male artists